Old School is a 2003 American black comedy film directed and co-written by Todd Phillips. The film stars Luke Wilson, Vince Vaughn, and Will Ferrell as depressed men in their thirties who seek to relive their college days by starting a fraternity, and the tribulations they encounter in doing so. The film was released on February 21, 2003, received mixed reviews from critics, and grossed $86 million worldwide.

Plot

Returning home early from a business trip, attorney Mitch Martin walks in on his girlfriend Heidi watching porn. Initially relieved, he discovers she is having an orgy. Learning it's a regular activity of hers, he breaks up with her. 

A few days later, Mitch encounters his high school crush, Nicole, at his friend Frank's wedding and makes an awkward impression. Later, he moves into a house located next to the fictional Harrison University campus in Upstate New York.

Mitch's friend Bernard throws a hugely successful housewarming party at Mitch's, dubbed Mitch-A-Palooza. Frank gets drunk and is seen streaking by his wife Marissa and her friends, putting a strain on their new marriage. 

The following morning, the trio run into an old acquaintance they used to ridicule at school: Gordon Pritchard, now the college dean. He informs them they must vacate the house as it's exclusively for campus housing. Bernard proposes starting a fraternity open to anyone to meet the housing criteria. The new fraternity carries out several hazing events throughout campus, attracting Pritchard and other faculty members' attention.

At a birthday party for one of Bernard's children, Nicole brings her boyfriend Mark, and Mitch later walks in on him in the bathroom, hooking up with a young woman. While initially discreet, he is forced to recount the incident to Nicole when Mark lies that the girl was with Mitch instead of himself. 

Later, the oldest fraternity member, Blue, dies of a heart attack during a "KY lube wrestling" match with two college girls at his birthday celebration. At Blue's funeral, Marissa asks Frank for a divorce.

Plotting revenge against the group, Pritchard asks the student council president, Megan, to revoke the fraternity's charter. Megan, who met her boyfriend at one of their parties, initially remains loyal to the fraternity until the dean bribes her with promises to help her get into Columbia Law School. By video, he claims that the group is violating university policies, subjecting the students in the non-sanctioned fraternity to expulsion.

Mitch discovers the group has the right to bypass Pritchard's ruling if all of their members complete various activities to prove their legitimacy. Frank is able to defeat James Carville in a debate session. Next, the fraternity successfully navigates its way through an academic exam largely due to the assistance of two of Mitch's co-workers, who help everyone cheat. In the school spirit evaluation, the fraternity loses points when Frank unsuccessfully attempts to jump through a ring of fire while dressed as the school mascot. He catches fire, resulting in firefighters being summoned.

Afterwards, Megan confronts Pritchard, telling him that she sabotaged the fraternity's charter, but she wasn't accepted into Columbia Law School as was promised. He walks away, leaving Megan with nothing—but after telling her, "I bribe people all the time, but I changed my mind. It's a free country, okay? Lesson learned."

Burned and humiliated, Frank rallies to give a strong performance in the floor exercise routine of the gymnastics competition. Bernard manages to complete the rings routine, leaving only the vault exercise remaining. Pritchard chooses Weensie, an obese member of the fraternity, to perform the vault. He executes a perfect landing, allowing the fraternity to pass gymnastics.

The fraternity completes the activities with an 84% average. However, Pritchard tells them that their average has dropped to a failing 58% after accounting for the absence of Blue. While the students are in despair, Megan arrives with tape recorded evidence of Pritchard's bribery. After a chase throughout campus, Frank obtains the tape and uses it to get Pritchard fired. The fraternity's charter is reinstated and they move into Pritchard's former residence.

Nicole visits Mitch as he moves out of the old fraternity house, and tells him she dumped Mark after catching him cheating. They reconcile, intent on moving their relationship forward. Mitch and Bernard withdraw from the fraternity. Frank, now divorced, takes over the leadership role.

In mid-credits, Mark, who is driving his sports-car, has an accident, striking and killing Pritchard while he is fly-fishing. They both die when the car explodes. Frank meets Heidi while shopping, who then invites him to a "get together," an invitation he enthusiastically accepts, knowing about her sexual escapades.

Cast

Production
At the 1998 Sundance Film Festival, Todd Phillips premiered the documentary Frat House to acclaim, winning  the Grand Jury Prize in the Documentary category with co-director Andrew Gurland. Ivan Reitman, who had produced the fraternity house comedy Animal House, saw the documentary and wanted to collaborate with Phillips to revive the frat comedy film genre. The first film from Reitman and Phillips’ partnership was the 2000 comedy Road Trip, which was also the first collaboration between screenwriter Scot Armstrong and Phillips. The success of Road Trip prompted Armstrong and Phillips to pitch Reitman on a fraternity-themed film centered around adult men instead of the usual college-aged kids. Said Armstrong, "There's a weird brotherhood that happens when you're in college were you're kind of finding yourself, and it was funny to think of old people doing it."

Old School was filmed in and around La Crescenta, California from January 7, 2002 until March 18, 2002. Filming locations included Palisades High School, UCLA, USC and Harvard University. The film is considered a forerunner to the Frat Pack since three of its stars—Ferrell, Vaughn, and Wilson—are core members of that group.

Reception

Critical response
Old School received mixed to positive reviews. On Rotten Tomatoes, the film has an approval rating of 60% based on reviews from 167 critics, with an average score of 5.6/10. The website's consensus states, "While not consistently funny, the movie does have its moments." On Metacritic, it has a score of 54 out of 100 based on reviews from 32 critics, indicating "Mixed or average reviews". Audiences surveyed by CinemaScore gave the film a grade B+ on a scale of A to F.

Elvis Mitchell of The New York Times called it a "sloppy, dumb, though occasionally funny comedy," comparing it to "a half-empty glass of Coke that's been sitting out for a couple of days; sure, it looks like cola, but one sip tells you exactly what's missing." He called out both Phillips and co-executive producer Ivan Reitman for rehashing their previous works and accused the latter of self-plagiarism by saying that the film was "so derivative of Animal House (and, more specifically, its children) that it's like one of those by-the-numbers imitative movies Homer Simpson is so obsessed with." Mitchell added that Phillips "comes even closer than Mr. Reitman to stealing from himself." Mitchell praised Ferrell for using "his hilarious, anxious zealotry to sell the part" and Cuthbert who "hijacks the handful of scenes she has."

Roger Ebert gave the film one out of four stars and stated, "This is not a funny movie, although it has a few good scenes and some nice work by Ferrell as an apparently compulsive nudist." Variety called it "This year's kinder, gentler Animal House."

Box office
The film grossed $17,453,216 in 2,689 theaters in its opening weekend at the U.S. Box office, opening at #2 behind Daredevil which was on its second week at the top spot. Old School has had gross receipts of $75,585,093 in the U.S. and Canada and $11,470,256 in international markets for a total of $87,055,349 worldwide.

Awards

 Artios Awards (2003) - nominated for Best Casting for Feature Film
 MTV Movie Awards (2003) - nominated for Best Comedic Performance (for Will Ferrell, losing to Mike Myers for Austin Powers in Goldmember) and for Best On-Screen Team (Ferrell, Vaughn, Wilson)
 Taurus Awards (2004) - nominated for Best Fire Stunt
 Spike Guys' Choice Awards (2012) - won for Guy Movie Hall of Fame

Home media
Old School was released on DVD in both rated and unrated versions. The unrated Blu-ray was released on December 16, 2008.

Soundtrack
At the Mitch-a-palooza party, Snoop Dogg and Kokane perform "Paper'd Up", sampling Eric B & Rakim's track "Paid in Full". The soundtrack also included "Fun Night" by Andrew W.K., "Dust in the Wind" by Kansas, "Hungry Like the Wolf", "The Farmer in the Dell", "Gonna Make You Sweat", "Louie Louie" by Black Flag, "Chariots of Fire", "Good Lovin' Gone Bad", "Master of Puppets" by Metallica, "Playground in My Mind" by Clint Holmes and "The Sound of Silence" by Simon & Garfunkel. The main song in this movie is "Here I Go Again" by Whitesnake, which is played when Will Ferrell's character is fixing his car and in the closing credits. Also, The Dan Band sings one of the famous songs of Bonnie Tyler, "Total Eclipse of the Heart" (with some interesting improvisational departures as to the cover's lyrics), and Styx's "Lady". During the introductory sequence Ryan Adams' "To Be Young (Is to Be Sad, Is to Be High)", co-written with David Rawlings, can be heard most memorably during the metal detector scene.

Canceled sequel
In 2006, a sequel, titled Old School Dos, was written by Scot Armstrong but was turned down by original stars, Will Ferrell and Vince Vaughn. The story concerned the aging fraternity going to Spring Break. While promoting Semi-Pro in 2008, Ferrell had this to say about the defunct project: "I read [the script]. Some super funny set pieces, but I don't know. I think Vince [Vaughn] had the same reaction. We’re just kind of doing the same thing again. It was like us going to Spring Break, but we’ve got to find this guy who's the head of a fraternity. Once again, funny things but it's just us once again back in a fraternity setting. It just felt like it was repeating. But watch, I'm over-thinking it."

References

External links

 Official website 

 
 
 

2003 films
2000s buddy comedy films
2003 comedy films
2000s sex comedy films
American buddy comedy films
American sex comedy films
DreamWorks Pictures films
2000s English-language films
Films about fraternities and sororities
Films about infidelity
Films directed by Todd Phillips
Films produced by Todd Phillips
Films set in 2003
Films set in New York (state)
Films shot in California
Films shot in Los Angeles
Films shot in Massachusetts
Films with screenplays by Scot Armstrong
Films with screenplays by Todd Phillips
Films scored by Theodore Shapiro
The Montecito Picture Company films
2000s American films